Richard Mikael Ehrenborg (1821–1887) was a Swedish politician.

Born in Skaraborg County to Casper Ehrenborg and Anna Fredrica Carlqvist, Richard Ehrenborg was raised alongside two sisters, Betty Ehrenborg and Ulla Bring. He earned a master of philosophy degree from Uppsala University and returned to Västergötland. Ehrenborg married Catharina Sparre in 1854 and was later elected to the lower house of the Riksdag from Lindesberg.

References 
 Gabriel Anrep, Svenska adelns Ättar-taflor, Volume 1
Ehrenborg, Richard runeberg.org
,  (1913), Volume XXVI. Register

1821 births
1887 deaths
Members of the Andra kammaren
Uppsala University alumni